YouTubers vs. TikTokers, billed as Battle of the Platforms was a amateur boxing event which featured YouTubers and TikTokers. The main event was between American YouTuber Austin McBroom and American TikToker Bryce Hall. The undercard included a exhibition bout between YouTuber AnEsonGib and TikToker Tayler Holder. It was held on June 12, 2021 at Hard Rock Stadium in Miami Gardens, Florida. 

In the main event, Austin McBroom defeated Bryce Hall in three rounds with a technical knockout. In the penultimate event, AnEsonGib defeated Tayler Holder in a unanimous decision. Overall, Team YouTube defeated Team TikTok 6-1. 

The event was promoted as the Battle of the Platforms by Social Gloves. The first two undercard matches were broadcast free of charge on social-media sites, and the pay-per-view was broadcast on LiveXLive.

Sports journalist Emily Austin was the correspondent for the Battle of the Platforms hosted by LiveXLive media.

Background 
McBroom feuded on Twitter with TikToker Bryce Hall in early March 2021, and a match was booked between them. On March 18, LiveXLive announced a full card of YouTubers vs. TikTokers in which YouTuber Tanner Fox was scheduled to face Nick Austin and YouTuber FaZe Jarvis was scheduled to face TikToker Micheal Le. The third fight was between YouTuber and rapper DDG and TikToker Nate Wyatt. In the third fight, TikToker Tayler Holder was scheduled to face a YouTuber chosen by fans; YouTuber Danny Duncan was also scheduled to face a random TikToker chosen by fans for the fourth fight. The semi-main event was between British YouTuber Deji and TikToker Vinnie Hacker. A majority of fans chose AnEsonGib in the fight against Tayler Holder. TikToker Nick Austin later left the event, and was replaced by Ryland Storms. YouTuber Danny Duncan also left, and was replaced by Ryan Johnston. TikToker Cale Saurage was added to the card.

Press conference 
The YouTube and TikTok boxers had their first press conference on May 18, which was hosted by YouTubers Keemstar and FouseyTube. Near the end of the press conference, a fight between McBroom and Hall broke out on stage.

Weigh-in 
Before the weigh-in began, there was an altercation backstage between Fousey and Deji, who was noticeably unfit in comparison to the other fighters. The weigh-in, also hosted by Keemstar and Fousey, was held on June 11 in Miami. Austin McBroom weighed 172 lb (78 kg), and Bryce Hall
weighed 165.4 lb (75 kg). For the co-main event, AnEsonGib weighed 179 lb (81 kg); Tayler Holder weighed 175 lb (79 kg).

Fight card 

 Y = Team YouTube
 T = Team TikTok

Broadcast 

The event was a pay-per-view broadcast on LiveXLive. Fousey was the ring announcer for the fights, except for the main event. It featured performances by DJ Khaled, Lil Baby, Migos and Trippie Redd. The first two fights on the undercard, Ryan Johnston vs. Cale Saurage and Landon McBroom vs Ben Azelart, were broadcast free of charge on YouTube. A pay-per-view image would show in the screen, blocking the person watching the main card for free.

Controversies

Storms–Fox controversy 
After Tanner Fox and Ryland Storms had their weigh-in one day before the fight, Storms claimed that Fox pulled out of the match because of their weight difference. On the Social Gloves live stream, it was announced that Fox had pulled out. At ringside, ring announcer Fousey interviewed Fox. Fox criticized Storms and said that he was willing to fight, but the commission would not allow it.

AnEsonGib–Holder controversy 
After AnEsonGib and Tayler Holder's bout, Fousey announced that the match was a majority draw; the official scorecard was 49-46, 49-46 and 50-46. Based on the scorecard, it could only have been a unanimous or split decision in favour of one of the fighters. Although Fousey was blamed by many, he disagreed with the results and said that AnEsonGib should have won. Based on the punch statistics, AnEsonGib fared substantially better and led many fans to wonder if there was a mistake or the fight was rigged. During the post-fight interview, AnEsonGib said that he was "robbed"; Holder also disagreed with the result, saying that he should have won. According to Holder, AnEsonGib weighed more than the agreed-upon limit; this forced Holder to artificially inflate his weight, presumably with weights in his pocket.

On June 14, ISKA director Tom Sconzo released a statement overturning the result and giving the victory to AnEsonGib by unanimous decision. According to Sconzo, the mistake was a "plain simple human error".

References 

2020s in Miami-Dade County, Florida
2021 in boxing
2021 in Internet culture
2021 in sports in Florida
Boxing matches
Crossover boxing events
Events in Florida
June 2021 sports events in the United States
Sports competitions in Miami Gardens, Florida
TikTok
YouTube
YouTube Boxing events